The 1995 season of the astronomy TV show Jack Horkheimer: Star Hustler starring Jack Horkheimer started on January 2, 1995. During this season, the show still had its original name, Jack Horkheimer: Star Hustler.  The show's episode numbering scheme changed several times during its run to coincide with major events in the show's history.


1995 season

References

External links 
  Star Gazer official website
 
 May 29-June 4, 1995 episode on YouTube

Jack Horkheimer:Star Hustler
1995 American television seasons